Muhammad Rizal bin Abdul Rahman (born 13 February 1979 in Singapore) is a Singaporean retired footballer.

Career

Rizal started playing football in the void deck of his HDB building, before joining the youth squad of Tampines Rovers Sports Club because his elementary school did not have a team.

After starting out with Home United Prime League squad, Rizal spent the rest of his career with Balestier Central (later known as Balestier Khalsa), even though he returned in 2004 to play for the Protectors for a season before headed back to Toa Payoh Stadium to sign for the Tigers in 2005.

References

External links
 Rizal Rahman at Soccerway

Singaporean footballers
Association football goalkeepers
1979 births
Living people